Inside the Vault is an American news magazine television show hosted by Cris Collinsworth that focuses on today’s American man. The show debuted online on February 3, 2011, and February 4, 2011 on WGN America. After its first season no plans were announced for a second season.

Format
Each episode of Inside the Vault examines a theme relating to today’s man, including: automobile, fashion, fatherhood, food, fitness, hobbies, philanthropy, sports, technology, travel, work-life balance, wellness, and what it is like to be American. Hosts and panelists view pre-taped segments, relevant to the theme and discuss it in a round-table format.

Cast

Hosts
Inside the Vault is hosted by sports analyst Cris Collinsworth and co-hosted by Last Comic Standing winner Alonzo Bodden and Wipeout co-host Jill Wagner.

Panelists
The series includes lifestyle segments from experts from Condé Nast and Source Interlink Media magazines and websites, including:

Angus MacKenzie – Editor-in-Chief, Motor Trend
 Nicholas Thompson – Senior Editor, The New Yorker
Michael Hogan – Executive Online Editor, Vanity Fair
Krista Smith – Senior West Coast Editor, Vanity Fair
 Andrew Knowlton – Restaurant Editor, Bon Appétit
Jason Tanz – Senior Editor, Wired
Alex Pasquariello – Associate Editor, Condé Nast Traveler
Michael Hainey – Deputy Editor, GQ
Jesse Ashlock – Senior Editor, Details

Episode list
The number in the first column refers to the episode's number within the whole series, whereas the number in the second column indicates the episode's number within that particular season. Although aired every Sunday, the episodes are posted online the Friday before, at 2:00PM.

Season 1: 2011

Production
The program is co-produced by Telepictures Productions, LiquidThread, Source Interlink Media, and Condé Nast.

References

External links
 

Nexstar Media Group
Television series by Tribune Entertainment
2011 American television series debuts
English-language television shows
2011 American television series endings